Serge Gainsbourg N° 4 is the fourth studio album by French musician Serge Gainsbourg, released in 1962. It is his last to feature his original style blending chanson and jazz, with a more varied approach with Latino and rock and roll influences.

Track listing

Personnel
Credits adapted from liner notes.
Serge Gainsbourg - vocals
 Paul Rovère – double bass
 Christian Garros – drums
 Alain Goraguer – piano, arrangements, conductor
Alain Goraguer et Son Orchestre - orchestra
Technical
Jacques Aubert - photography

References

External links 
 
 

1962 albums
Serge Gainsbourg albums
French-language albums
Philips Records albums